Bakery Hill is an inner city suburb of Ballarat in Victoria, Australia. The area is a mix of residential and commercial, as it has been since it came into existence at the beginning of the gold rush. In the present time it is mainly known for its restaurants and pubs, as well as fast food. The suburb boundaries are that of Mair, East, Barkly, Steinfield and Peel Streets.

Bakery Hill is one of the most historic places in Ballarat and is culturally important to the city.  At what is now 29 St. Paul's Way, several large public meetings were held before and after the Eureka Stockade. According to a report commissioned by the City of Ballarat in 2015, given documentary evidence and its elevation, it is the most likely location where the insurgents swore the Eureka oath to the Southern Cross on 1 December 1854. It was also one of the richest mining leads in Australia and was the site where the Welcome Nugget was discovered on 9 June 1858.

Topography
The suburb is located on a hill named for the bakery that existed on the site from the 1850s. The boundary of Bakery Hill is Peel Street to the west; Mair Street to the north; East Street to the east and Steinfield Street to the south.  It was officially gazetted from Ballarat in 1992.

History

Bakery Hill dates back to the foundation of Ballarat and the town of East Ballarat. The suburb is located to the East of Ballarat, which known for its lack of town planning. East Ballarat developed organically around the site of gold mines. The Eureka Stockade began when insurgents swore the Eureka oath, their allegiance to the Southern Cross on 1 December 1854. Today, a flag pole flies the Eureka Flag to welcome those who arrive at the city from the East.

The area was of prime importance to commerce and the early inhabitants of Ballarat because it was the location where Victoria Street (the road to Melbourne) met Main Road (the road to Geelong).

Bridge Mall and Street are named after the first bridge to cross the Yarrowee River, which existed until the river was directed underground. The street's width reflects the width of the original bridge. The street is six feet higher than it was in the 1850s and 1860s after it was built up to avoid flooding, which had become frequent due to extensive mining on the Black Hill Flats.

Heritage
The site of the Eureka Stockade meetings is now a parcel of land which subject to a major new residential complex, which is currently being constructed. For a hundred years the site had a school positioned on it, Ballarat East State School No.1919 (St. Paul's) from 1877, which was demolished in the 1960s and turned into a carpark.

There are a number of heritage buildings which date back to the 1850s. The area is known for its unique architecture, including an old three-storey pub located at 3 Peel Street, formerly North Grand Hotel, and a series of semi-detached shops at 26 Bridge Mall. The hotel was famous for the murder of a barmaid, Winifred Brooks, on 29 December 1932 for which Patrick Sheedy was convicted and executed. St. Paul's Anglican Church, built in 1865, is significant for its architecture because of a series of changes made to the building to cope with mining activity. It was built on top of an earlier church which had collapsed because of mining activity.

The old school located at the corner of Humffray Street and Mair Street was built in 1876. It operated as a primary school, Humffray Street State School (No. 34), until the 1990s during the Kennett Government's rationalisation of the education system. The school for many years was an antiques centre, but is currently being renovated into a boutique hotel. At the turn of the twentieth century, the school was known for its exceptional scholarship and successful students.

The suburb has a kindergarten.

Notable people
 Alec Barr (1895–1918), Private in the 1st ANZAC Salvage Section attended Humffray Street State School.
 Belle Green (née Menzies) (1893–1984), Secretary to the Exhibition Trustees, Museums Victoria attended Humffray Street State School.
 Robert Menzies, 12th Prime Minister of Australia - Attended Humffray Street State School 1906–1907.
 Arthur Nicholson (1903–1981), civil engineer, Mayor and councillor of Ballarat who created the Ballarat Begonia Festival attended Humffray Street State School.

Services

Bakery Hill has a number of services. This includes the Petspiration Group Ballarat Office & Bakery Hill Australia Post situated on Humffray St, Lincraft, Clark Rubber, PETstock, Cheep As Chips, Reece Plumbing, Bakery Hill Kindergarten, as well as a number of pubs, restaurants and cafes including McDonald's that features at the main roundabout on the corner of Humffray and Bridge Streets. People often mistake Bakery Hill shopping centre as being in the suburb, which is officially located in the suburb of Ballarat East.

References

See also
 Electoral district of Ballarat East
 Ballarat

Suburbs of Ballarat